S' Agapo (Greek: Σ' αγαπώ; I love you) is the thirteenth studio album by Greek singer Natasa Theodoridou, released on 14 October 2013 by Minos EMI. It peaked at number 3 on the Greek albums chart.

Track listing

Chart performance

Personnel 

Production & technical
Antonis Vardis – art director, executive producer
Giannis Doulamis – art director, executive producer
Antonis Vardis – arrangement, programming, keys
Akis Eleftheriadis – recording engineer, mixing

Instruments
Panagiotis Terzidis - bouzouki, mandolin, baglamas
Stavros Pazarentsis – clarinet
Foivos Zaharopoulos – guitar
Romeo Avlastimidis – violin

Vocals
Natasa Theodoridou – vocals
Giannis Vardis – background vocals

Visuals & imagery
Giorgos Katsanakis – photographer
Vasilis Bouloubasis – hair stylist
Giorgos Segredakis – wardrobe stylist, styling
Dimitris Panagiotakopoulos – artwork

References

2013 albums
Greek-language albums
Natasa Theodoridou albums
Sony Music Greece albums